Sočanica is a basilica of a 9-10th-century church in the village Sočanica, in Leposavić, Kosovo. The stone decoration dates it to the reigns of Simeon I of Bulgaria (893-927) and Petar of Serbia. It was in use in the 11th and 12th centuries according to grave finds. In the reign of Grand Prince Uroš II, the site was known as Sečenica and was defended from the Byzantines from the newly built fortress at Galič, protecting the bridge over Ibar and the road to Ras.

The site draws continuity with Municipium Dardanorum.

References
Janković Đorđe N., On the church of Raška in pre-Nemanjić times, Glasnik Srpskog arheološkog društva 2004, vol. 21, iss. 20, pp. 63–80, University of Belgrade, Faculty of Philosophy

10th century in Serbia
Serbian Orthodox church buildings in Kosovo
Cultural heritage of Kosovo
Medieval Serbian sites in Kosovo
Grand Principality of Serbia
Medieval Serbian Orthodox Church buildings